Abraham Hall, constructed in 1889, is located on the northeast side of Old Muirkirk Road in the center of the historic African American community of Rossville, a section of Prince George's County, Maryland near Beltsville.

It was constructed by the Benevolent Sons and Daughters of Abraham, an African American society that was established for the social welfare of its members. Originally known as Rebecca Lodge #6 of the Benevolent Sons and Daughters of Abraham, the building was constructed by John W. Jackson in 1889 in the burgeoning community of Rossville. Abraham Hall, an excellent example of a multi-purpose building associated with African Americans, served as a meeting hall, a house of worship, a school, and a social hall for African Americans living in a segregated society. The lodge hall functioned as the community black school, until a Rosenwald School was built in 1922.

The structure is set back from the road on a  grassy lot with mature trees. It is a three-bay, two-story gable front frame lodge building with a brick foundation, wood lap siding with cornerboards, and a shake roof with a boxed cornice. A brick chimney rises from the northwest slope of the roof. Both the interior and exterior of the building were carefully restored between 1986 and 1991 using original materials or in-kind replacements.

It was listed on the National Register of Historic Places in 2005.

References

External links

, including photo in 2004, at Maryland Historical Trust website
African-American Heritage Survey, October 1996: Properties Within or Closely Associated with Historic Communities; Abraham Hall, entry 62-023-07, p. 19

African-American history of Prince George's County, Maryland
Community centers in Maryland
Beltsville, Maryland
Buildings and structures in Prince George's County, Maryland
Churches in Prince George's County, Maryland
Historically segregated African-American schools in Maryland
Schools in Prince George's County, Maryland
Buildings and structures completed in 1889
Clubhouses on the National Register of Historic Places in Maryland
National Register of Historic Places in Prince George's County, Maryland
Properties of religious function on the National Register of Historic Places in Maryland
School buildings on the National Register of Historic Places in Maryland
Wooden buildings and structures in the United States
1889 establishments in Maryland
Historic American Buildings Survey in Maryland